Marble Brewery may refer to:

Marble Brewery (Albuquerque, New Mexico), an American brewery
Marble Brewery (Manchester, England), a British brewery